Harold Jack Underwood (1908–1979) was a notable New Zealand clerk, farmer, toy-maker and manufacturer. He was born in Wellington, New Zealand in 1908.

References

1908 births
1979 deaths
New Zealand farmers
People from Wellington City